The Double Sculls Challenge Cup is a rowing event for men's double sculls at the annual Henley Royal Regatta on the River Thames at Henley-on-Thames in England.  It is open to male crews from all eligible rowing clubs. Two clubs may combine to make an entry.

On the centenary of the regatta in 1939 a Centenary Double Sculls event was introduced. The crews in the final were Jack Beresford and Dick Southwood of Thames Rowing Club against Giorgio Scherli and Ettore Broschi of Trieste, who were the reigning European champions. The result was a dead-heat.

Winners

References

Events at Henley Royal Regatta
Rowing trophies and awards